Pablo Andrés Mannara (born April 18, 1977 in Lanús, Argentina) is an Argentine association football midfielder currently playing for Racing de Córdoba of the Torneo Argentino A in Argentina.

Personal life
He is the older brother of Ferro Carril Oeste striker Rodrigo Mannara.

Teams
  Lanús 1994-1995
  Arsenal de Sarandí 1997-2000
  Ferro Carril Oeste 2000-2001
  Olimpo de Bahía Blanca 2001
  Tigre 2002
  Olimpo de Bahía Blanca 2002-2004
  Quilmes 2004-2005
  Pontevedra CF 2005
  Nueva Chicago 2005-2006
  Talleres 2007
  Platense 2007
  Almagro 2008
  Cobreloa 2009
  Deportivo Armenio 2009
  Racing de Córdoba 2010–present

References

External links
 

1977 births
Living people
Argentine footballers
Argentine expatriate footballers
Club Atlético Platense footballers
Ferro Carril Oeste footballers
Arsenal de Sarandí footballers
Nueva Chicago footballers
Quilmes Atlético Club footballers
Club Almagro players
Olimpo footballers
Talleres de Córdoba footballers
Club Atlético Lanús footballers
Cobreloa footballers
Expatriate footballers in Chile
Expatriate footballers in Spain
Association football midfielders
Sportspeople from Lanús